Edmilson Ferreira, also known as Castor (born March 10, 1979) is a Brazilian footballer who plays as an offensive midfielder for Operário (MS)

In 2008, he joined Daejeon Citizen, but due to a contract issue, Daejeon Citizen did not register him in the K League.

References
Castor at Sambafoot
대전 카스토르 "팀에 보탬이 되기 위해 왔다" 

1979 births
Living people
Footballers from Curitiba
Brazilian footballers
Brazilian expatriate footballers
Association football midfielders
Coritiba Foot Ball Club players
C.F. Os Belenenses players
Iraty Sport Club players
Joinville Esporte Clube players
Club Athletico Paranaense players
Sociedade Esportiva do Gama players
Associação Atlética Ponte Preta players
Expatriate footballers in South Korea
Ituano FC players
Sociedade Esportiva e Recreativa Caxias do Sul players
Clube 15 de Novembro players
Brazilian expatriate sportspeople in South Korea
União Esporte Clube players